Mario Artali (18 November 1938 – 1 January 2023) was an Italian businessman and politician. A member of the Italian Socialist Party, he served in the Chamber of Deputies from 1972 to 1976.

Artali died in Milan on 1 January 2023, at the age of 84.

References

1938 births
2023 deaths
20th-century Italian businesspeople
21st-century Italian businesspeople
University of Milan alumni
Bocconi University alumni
Italian Socialist Party politicians
Deputies of Legislature VI of Italy
Politicians from Bologna